Laurel Lake is located in Grand Teton National Park, in the U. S. state of Wyoming. Laurel Lake is  WNW of Jenny Lake and is impounded by a terminal moraine but also lies directly along the Teton Fault.

References

Lakes of Grand Teton National Park